Bettermann is a German surname. It may refer to one of these people:

 Erik Bettermann, director-general of Deutsche Welle from 2001 to 2013
 Hilda Bettermann (1942-2023), American politician, member of the Minnesota House of Representatives from 1991 to 1999

See also 
 Betterman (disambiguation)
 Bettelmann, a card game